L.E. Bennett (December 4, 1933 – July 30, 2015) was an activist in the Civil rights movement in the United States from the 1950s to the 1970s. Bennett's most notable role was his leadership of the Local#6131, of the Communications Workers of America. He began his career as a janitor with Southwestern Bell/AT&T but eventually became the president of the Colored National Labor Union. He made valuable contributions regarding workplace injustice, social injustice, and racism.

Early life and education
In 1960, Bennett attended St. Philips College where he graduated, with honors. In 1964, he attended St. Marys University, where he studied business. In 1992, he graduated with a Bachelor of Theology degree from Guadalupe Theological College. He received his master's degree in 1994 and was awarded an honorary Doctorate of Divinity in 1997.

Career
Bennett was drafted into the Korean War as a U.S. Army soldier. After being discharged from the army, Bennett found work as a custodian with Southwestern Bell. Over time, he was told by human resources that he wouldn't be able to apply for a better job due to racial discrimination.

As a labor leader, Bennett integrated the organization and created opportunities for people of color. Bennett also assisted the community in voter registration and obtaining funds to rehabilitate homes.

Bennett was ordained after completing training with his pastor, Rev. C.M. Graham of Mt. Calvary Baptist Church in San Antonio, TX, and in February 1989 gave his first official sermon. After his Doctor of Philosophy in Theology, he became Rev. Dr. L.E. Bennett in the late 1980s.

Recognition
He received certificates from the NAACP signed by Roy Wilkins, Rev. C.D. Owens, and W.C. Patton, as well as an award from Wall of Tolerance signed by Rosa Parks.

References

1933 births
2015 deaths
African-American activists
NAACP activists
Activists from Texas
American civil rights activists
History of civil rights in the United States
American Christian clergy
Doctors of Divinity
Communications Workers of America people
Communications Workers of America